In geometry, a convex uniform honeycomb is a uniform tessellation which fills three-dimensional Euclidean space with non-overlapping convex uniform polyhedral cells.

Twenty-eight such honeycombs are known:
 the familiar cubic honeycomb and 7 truncations thereof;
 the alternated cubic honeycomb and 4 truncations thereof;
 10 prismatic forms based on the uniform plane tilings (11 if including the cubic honeycomb);
 5 modifications of some of the above by elongation and/or gyration.

They can be considered the three-dimensional analogue to the uniform tilings of the plane.

The Voronoi diagram of any lattice forms a convex uniform honeycomb in which the cells are zonohedra.

History 
 1900: Thorold Gosset enumerated the list of semiregular convex polytopes with regular cells (Platonic solids) in his publication On the Regular and Semi-Regular Figures in Space of n Dimensions, including one regular cubic honeycomb, and two semiregular forms with tetrahedra and octahedra.
 1905: Alfredo Andreini enumerated 25 of these tessellations.
 1991: Norman Johnson's manuscript Uniform Polytopes identified the list of 28.
 1994: Branko Grünbaum, in his paper Uniform tilings of 3-space, also independently enumerated all 28, after discovering errors in Andreini's publication. He found the 1905 paper, which listed 25, had 1 wrong, and 4 being missing. Grünbaum states in this paper that Norman Johnson deserves priority for achieving the same enumeration in 1991. He also mentions that I. Alexeyev of Russia had contacted him regarding a putative enumeration of these forms, but that Grünbaum was unable to verify this at the time.
 2006: George Olshevsky, in his manuscript Uniform Panoploid Tetracombs, along with repeating the derived list of 11 convex uniform tilings, and 28 convex uniform honeycombs, expands a further derived list of 143 convex uniform tetracombs (Honeycombs of uniform 4-polytopes in 4-space).

Only 14 of the convex uniform polyhedra appear in these patterns:
 three of the five Platonic solids (the tetrahedron, cube, and octahedron),
 six of the thirteen Archimedean solids (the ones with reflective tetrahedral or octahedral symmetry), and
 five of the infinite family of prisms (the 3-, 4-, 6-, 8-, and 12-gonal ones; the 4-gonal prism duplicates the cube).

The icosahedron, snub cube, and square antiprism appear in some alternations, but those honeycombs cannot be realised with all edges unit length.

Names 
This set can be called the regular and semiregular honeycombs. It has been called the Archimedean honeycombs by analogy with the convex uniform (non-regular) polyhedra, commonly called Archimedean solids. Recently Conway has suggested naming the set as the Architectonic tessellations and the dual honeycombs as the Catoptric tessellations.

The individual honeycombs are listed with names given to them by Norman Johnson. (Some of the terms used below are defined in Uniform 4-polytope#Geometric derivations for 46 nonprismatic Wythoffian uniform 4-polytopes)

For cross-referencing, they are given with list indices from Andreini (1-22), Williams(1-2,9-19), Johnson (11-19, 21–25, 31–34, 41–49, 51–52, 61–65), and Grünbaum(1-28). Coxeter uses δ4 for a cubic honeycomb, hδ4 for an alternated cubic honeycomb, qδ4 for a quarter cubic honeycomb, with subscripts for other forms based on the ring patterns of the Coxeter diagram.

Compact Euclidean uniform tessellations (by their infinite Coxeter group families) 

The fundamental infinite Coxeter groups for 3-space are:
 The , [4,3,4], cubic,  (8 unique forms plus one alternation)
 The , [4,31,1], alternated cubic,  (11 forms, 3 new)
 The  cyclic group, [(3,3,3,3)] or [3[4]],  (5 forms, one new)

There is a correspondence between all three families. Removing one mirror from  produces , and removing one mirror from  produces . This allows multiple constructions of the same honeycombs. If cells are colored based on unique positions within each Wythoff construction, these different symmetries can be shown.

In addition there are 5 special honeycombs which don't have pure reflectional symmetry and are constructed from reflectional forms with elongation and gyration operations.

The total unique honeycombs above are 18.

The prismatic stacks from infinite Coxeter groups for 3-space are:
 The ×, [4,4,2,∞] prismatic group,  (2 new forms)
 The ×, [6,3,2,∞] prismatic group,  (7 unique forms)
 The ×, [(3,3,3),2,∞] prismatic group,  (No new forms)
 The ××, [∞,2,∞,2,∞] prismatic group,  (These all become a cubic honeycomb)

In addition there is one special elongated form of the triangular prismatic honeycomb.

The total unique prismatic honeycombs above (excluding the cubic counted previously) are 10.

Combining these counts, 18 and 10 gives us the total 28 uniform honeycombs.

The C̃3, [4,3,4] group (cubic) 
The regular cubic honeycomb, represented by Schläfli symbol {4,3,4}, offers seven unique derived uniform honeycombs via truncation operations. (One redundant form, the runcinated cubic honeycomb, is included for completeness though identical to the cubic honeycomb.) The reflectional symmetry is the affine Coxeter group [4,3,4]. There are four index 2 subgroups that generate alternations: [1+,4,3,4], [(4,3,4,2+)], [4,3+,4], and [4,3,4]+, with the first two generated repeated forms, and the last two are nonuniform.

B̃3, [4,31,1] group 

The , [4,3] group offers 11 derived forms via truncation operations, four being unique uniform honeycombs. There are 3 index 2 subgroups that generate alternations: [1+,4,31,1], [4,(31,1)+], and [4,31,1]+. The first generates repeated honeycomb, and the last two are nonuniform but included for completeness.

The honeycombs from this group are called alternated cubic because the first form can be seen as a cubic honeycomb with alternate vertices removed, reducing cubic cells to tetrahedra and creating octahedron cells in the gaps.

Nodes are indexed left to right as 0,1,0',3 with 0' being below and interchangeable with 0. The alternate cubic names given are based on this ordering.

Ã3, [3[4]] group 

There is one index 2 subgroup [3[4]]+ which generates the snub form, which is not uniform, but included for completeness.

Nonwythoffian forms (gyrated and elongated) 
Three more uniform honeycombs are generated by breaking one or another of the above honeycombs where its faces form a continuous plane, then rotating alternate layers by 60 or 90 degrees (gyration) and/or inserting a layer of prisms (elongation).

The elongated and gyroelongated alternated cubic tilings have the same vertex figure, but are not alike.  In the elongated form, each prism meets a tetrahedron at one triangular end and an octahedron at the other.  In the gyroelongated form, prisms that meet tetrahedra at both ends alternate with prisms that meet octahedra at both ends.

The gyroelongated triangular prismatic tiling has the same vertex figure as one of the plain prismatic tilings; the two may be derived from the gyrated and plain triangular prismatic tilings, respectively, by inserting layers of cubes.

Prismatic stacks 
Eleven prismatic tilings are obtained by stacking the eleven uniform plane tilings, shown below, in parallel layers.  (One of these honeycombs is the cubic, shown above.)  The vertex figure of each is an irregular bipyramid whose faces are isosceles triangles.

The C̃2×Ĩ1(∞), [4,4,2,∞], prismatic group 

There are only 3 unique honeycombs from the square tiling, but all 6 tiling truncations are listed below for completeness, and tiling images are shown by colors corresponding to each form.

The G̃2xĨ1(∞), [6,3,2,∞] prismatic group

Enumeration of Wythoff forms 

All nonprismatic Wythoff constructions by Coxeter groups are given below, along with their alternations. Uniform solutions are indexed with Branko Grünbaum's listing. Green backgrounds are shown on repeated honeycombs, with the relations are expressed in the extended symmetry diagrams.

Examples
All 28 of these tessellations are found in crystal arrangements.

The alternated cubic honeycomb is of special importance since its vertices form a cubic close-packing of spheres. The space-filling truss of packed octahedra and tetrahedra was apparently first discovered by Alexander Graham Bell and independently re-discovered by Buckminster Fuller (who called it the octet truss and patented it in the 1940s).

. Octet trusses are now among the most common types of truss used in construction.

Frieze forms 
If cells are allowed to be uniform tilings, more uniform honeycombs can be defined:

Families:
×: [4,4,2]  Cubic slab honeycombs (3 forms)
×: [6,3,2]  Tri-hexagonal slab honeycombs (8 forms)
 ×: [(3,3,3),2]  Triangular slab honeycombs (No new forms)
××: [∞,2,2]  =  Cubic column honeycombs (1 form)
×: [p,2,∞]  Polygonal column honeycombs (analogous to duoprisms: these look like a single infinite tower of p-gonal prisms, with the remaining space filled with apeirogonal prisms)
 ××: [∞,2,∞,2] = [4,4,2] -  =  (Same as cubic slab honeycomb family)

The first two forms shown above are semiregular (uniform with only regular facets), and were listed by Thorold Gosset in 1900 respectively as the 3-ic semi-check and tetroctahedric semi-check.

Scaliform honeycomb
A scaliform honeycomb is vertex-transitive, like a uniform honeycomb, with regular polygon faces while cells and higher elements are only required to be orbiforms, equilateral, with their vertices lying on hyperspheres. For 3D honeycombs, this allows a subset of Johnson solids along with the uniform polyhedra. Some scaliforms can be generated by an alternation process, leaving, for example, pyramid and cupola gaps.

Hyperbolic forms 

There are 9 Coxeter group families of compact uniform honeycombs in hyperbolic 3-space, generated as Wythoff constructions, and represented by ring permutations of the Coxeter-Dynkin diagrams for each family.

From these 9 families, there are a total of 76 unique honeycombs generated:
 [3,5,3] :  - 9 forms
 [5,3,4] :  - 15 forms
 [5,3,5] :  - 9 forms
 [5,31,1] :  - 11 forms (7 overlap with [5,3,4] family, 4 are unique)
 [(4,3,3,3)] :  - 9 forms
 [(4,3,4,3)] :  - 6 forms
 [(5,3,3,3)] :  - 9 forms
 [(5,3,4,3)] :  - 9 forms
 [(5,3,5,3)] :  - 6 forms

Several non-Wythoffian forms outside the list of 76 are known; it is not known how many there are.

Paracompact hyperbolic forms 

There are also 23 paracompact Coxeter groups of rank 4. These families can produce uniform honeycombs with unbounded facets or vertex figure, including ideal vertices at infinity:

References 

 John H. Conway, Heidi Burgiel, Chaim Goodman-Strauss, (2008) The Symmetries of Things,  (Chapter 21, Naming the Archimedean and Catalan polyhedra and tilings, Architectonic and Catoptric tessellations, p 292–298, includes all the nonprismatic forms)
 Branko Grünbaum, (1994) Uniform tilings of 3-space. Geombinatorics 4, 49 - 56.
 Norman Johnson (1991) Uniform Polytopes, Manuscript
  (Chapter 5: Polyhedra packing and space filling)
 
 Kaleidoscopes: Selected Writings of H.S.M. Coxeter, edited by F. Arthur Sherk, Peter McMullen, Anthony C. Thompson, Asia Ivic Weiss, Wiley-Interscience Publication, 1995,  
 (Paper 22) H.S.M. Coxeter, Regular and Semi Regular Polytopes I, [Math. Zeit. 46 (1940) 380–407, MR 2,10] (1.9 Uniform space-fillings)
 A. Andreini, (1905) Sulle reti di poliedri regolari e semiregolari e sulle corrispondenti reti correlative (On the regular and semiregular nets of polyhedra and on the corresponding correlative nets), Mem. Società Italiana della Scienze, Ser.3, 14 75–129. PDF 
 D. M. Y. Sommerville, (1930) An Introduction to the Geometry of n Dimensions. New York, E. P. Dutton, . 196 pp. (Dover Publications edition, 1958) Chapter X: The Regular Polytopes
  Chapter 5. Joining polyhedra
 Crystallography of Quasicrystals: Concepts, Methods and Structures by Walter Steurer, Sofia Deloudi (2009), p. 54-55. 12 packings of 2 or more uniform polyhedra with cubic symmetry

External links

 
Uniform Honeycombs in 3-Space VRML models
Elementary Honeycombs Vertex transitive space filling honeycombs with non-uniform cells.
 Uniform partitions of 3-space, their relatives and embedding, 1999
The Uniform Polyhedra
Virtual Reality Polyhedra The Encyclopedia of Polyhedra
octet truss animation
Review: A. F. Wells, Three-dimensional nets and polyhedra, H. S. M. Coxeter (Source: Bull. Amer. Math. Soc. Volume 84, Number 3 (1978), 466-470.)
 
 

Honeycombs (geometry)